A Clean Air Zone (CAZ) is an area in the United Kingdom where targeted action is taken to improve air quality. A CAZ can be non-charging or charging.

Whether a vehicle is charged when entering or moving through a CAZ depends on the type of vehicle and the Euro standard of the vehicle. The amount charged is up to the local authority responsible for the CAZ. Ultra-low-emission vehicles are not charged when entering or moving through a Clean Air Zone.

Classes of charging Clean Air Zone

List of Clean Air Zones

See also
 Congestion charge – a related concept for tackling congestion
 London low emission zone

References

External links
 Nitrogen Dioxide Emissions - Euro 6 vs Older Euro Standard Engines
 Carbon Monoxide Emissions - Euro 6 vs Older Euro Standard Engines 

Environmental law in the United Kingdom
Air pollution in the United Kingdom
Motoring taxation in the United Kingdom
Electronic toll collection
Road congestion charge schemes in the United Kingdom
Transport policy in the United Kingdom